Leith is a port and area of Edinburgh, Scotland

Leith may also refer to:

Places 
Leith (Edinburgh ward), Scotland
Leith, North Dakota, United States
Leith, Ohio, United States
Leith, Ontario, Canada
Leith, Pennsylvania, United States, see List of places in Pennsylvania: La–Ll
Leith, Tasmania, Australia
Leith (UK Parliament constituency), Edinburgh, Scotland
River Leith, Cumbria, England
Water of Leith, Edinburgh, Scotland
Water of Leith, New Zealand, (or Leith River or Leith Stream), South Island, New Zealand
Leith Harbour, South Georgia, southern Atlantic Ocean
Leith Hill, Surrey, England
Glenleith, Dunedin, New Zealand

People 
Leith (surname)

See also
Laith, an Arabic name
Leath, an ancient subdivision of Cumberland, England
Leithe, Bochum, North Rhine-Westphalia, Germany
Craigleith, Scotland
Lethe (disambiguation)
Lieth, in Germany